Fozia Soomro (1966-2002) was a Pakistani regional folk singer.

Early life
Fozia was born Hakeeman, the daughter of song vocalist Haji Nathoo Soomro. Due to a lack of necessities and resources, her parents relocated to Tando Muhammad Khan, Sindh, Pakistan, where she started singing at an early age.

Singing career
Fozia started singing discreetly at the age of sixteen because of her conservative family. She was introduced to Radio Pakistan through Naseer Mirza, who recorded her two songs, "Be qadra qadr na kayaee ko" and "Chade wai chade wai sathi sukhan ja". These two songs were instant hits and brought her fame. She sang in Thari and Marwari. Soomro performed at parties, anniversaries, weddings, and other occasions of gathering. Fozia sang in adulation of Benazir Bhutto, the former Prime Minister of Pakistan.

Awards
She was awarded the Shah Latif Award.

Death
On September 4, 2002, Fozia died of kidney failure. She is buried in Sakhi Burhan Shah cemetery, Tando Muhammad Khan.

References

External links
 Fozia Soomro's Video Channel

1966 births
2002 deaths
Sindhi music
People from Tharparkar District
20th-century Pakistani women singers
Recipients of Latif Award